Respect is a single British television drama film, written by Richard LaPlante and directed by Terry Marcel, that first broadcast on 17 December 1996 on ITV. The film stars Nick Berry as Bobby Carr and is based on the early years in the life of notorious East London villain Ray Barton, a professional boxer who is forced to retire from the sport after receiving a serious eye injury during a fight. He attempts to make money through a nightclub scam, but his illegal activities are soon discovered and he is sentenced to community service, where he is forced to teach boxing to teenagers at a local youth club.
Scripts for a follow up to the film were blocked after lengthy court proceedings during which Barton's lawyers also ordered the original film be withdrawn from public sale.

Jayne Ashbourne, Mark Addy, Dean Williamson, Rachel Victoria Roberts, Nicholas Ball, Carol Harrison and Garey Bridges are also credited as principal members of the cast. The majority of the film was shot at Shepperton Studios. The film was released on VHS on 27 March 2000 as a double-header with another of Berry's television films, Paparazzo.

Cast
 Nick Berry as Bobby Carr
 Jayne Ashbourne as Rosie Carr
 Mark Addy as Joe Carr
 Dean Williamson as Trevor Nye
 Rachel Victoria Roberts as Janine
 Nicholas Ball as Ronnie Ellis
 Carol Harrison as Veronica
 Garey Bridges as Billy Price
 Philip Woodford as Stephen Ruther
 Adam Searles as Kevin Murphy
 Karl Moffatt as John Simpson
 Kenneth Cope as Stan Peters
 Nicholas Beveney as Ralph Grandistone
 Paul Kember as Tipper Donovan
 Graham Bryan as Oliver Wright
 Lee MacDonald as Danny Phillips

References

External links
 

1996 television films
1996 films
1996 drama films
Films directed by Terry Marcel
Films set in London
Television series by Yorkshire Television
ITV television dramas
Television series by ITV Studios
1990s British films
British drama television films